Delamu is a 2004 documentary film directed by Fifth Generation Chinese filmmaker, Tian Zhuangzhuang. Delamu documents the people living in the Nujiang River Valley, along the Tea Horse Road, an ancient trade route between China's Yunnan province and Tibet. The film was jointly produced by companies in the People's Republic of China, and Japan. It had its American premier at the 2004 Tribeca Film Festival.

The title "Delamu" refers to the Tibetan word for "peaceful angel", and the name of one of the mules owned by a villager in the film.

Synopsis
Stretching across Yunnan, Tibet, and into the Himalayas, the heart of Delamu is the "Tea Horse Road". One of the oldest caravan routes in Asia, the film documents one such caravan as it transfers raw material to a modern construction site.

As Tian travels with the caravan, he interviews people who have lived along the road for decades, including a priest who was thought to have disappeared during the Cultural Revolution, a 104-year-old woman, and a mule driver who owns the titular Delamu.

Reception
Though quiet and a far cry from either the insulated Springtime in a Small Town or the epic The Blue Kite, Tian's Delamu has nevertheless garnered both praise and some criticism. On the one hand it has been well received by critics in Asia. The inaugural Chinese Film Directors Association Awards bestowed its honor for best director to Tian for Delamu. It has similarly been well received in the West. In its premier at Tribeca, Delamu's cinematography of the stunning landscape was praised by critics.

On the other hand, many critics often cannot help but to compare the film to Tian's account of the Cultural Revolution, The Blue Kite, often negatively. One notes the "travelogue sheen" as preventing real penetration into the subject matter. Another (admittedly a socialist critic) complained that Delamu despite its beauty, was a "National Geographic style travelogue [that] broke no new ground."

Notes

External links

 Interview with Tian Zhuangzhuang on Delamu

Chinese documentary films
2004 films
2000s Mandarin-language films
Films directed by Tian Zhuangzhuang
2004 documentary films